The South African Railways Class 5E, Series 3 of 1958 was an electric locomotive.

In 1958 and 1959, the South African Railways placed fifty-five Class 5E, Series 3 electric locomotives with a Bo-Bo wheel arrangement in mainline service.

Manufacturer
Like the Series 2, all the Class 5E, Series 3 locomotives were built for the South African Railways (SAR) by Vulcan Foundry (VF), subcontracted by English Electric (EE) who had designed the locomotive and supplied the electric components. They were built in 1958 and entered service in 1958 and 1959, numbered in the range from E536 to E590.

The number range of the Series 3 locomotives did not follow directly on that of the Series 2, since the Class 5E1, Series 1 and the Class ES locomotives were allocated most of the numbers in between. Twelve numbers, E499, E513, E514 and those in the range from E527 to E535 were never allocated.

Orientation
These dual cab locomotives had a roof access ladder on one side only, just to the right of the cab access door. The roof access ladder end was marked as the no. 2 end. A corridor along the centre of the locomotive connected the cabs, which were identical except that Cab 2 was where the handbrake was located.

Service
Crews found the Class 5E to give a rough ride, which soon earned it the nickname . The successor Class 5E1 with its new design bogies gave a smoother ride.

The Class 5E family entered service on the Natal mainline between Durban and Johannesburg and eventually served almost country-wide as electrification was completed on more mainlines. In 1960, sixty units of the Class 5E family were allocated to the Witbank section upon completion of its electrification. In December 1961, twelve of them were replaced by Class 32-000 diesel-electric locomotives and transferred to the newly-electrified Touws River-Beaufort West section. More followed to replace the Class 25 condensers that were being transferred from that section to Beaconsfield in Kimberley at the time.

After withdrawal from service, only one Series 3 locomotive, no. E576, was sold into industrial service. It went to the Driefontein gold mine near Carletonville where, for an unknown reason, it was given the number plates from Series 2 no. E343 which had also been acquired by Driefontein.

Numbers E563 and E590 were transferred to MetroRail, later part of the Passenger Rail Agency of South Africa, for use as shunting locomotives at the MetroRail Depot in Salt River, Cape Town. They still survive, staged out of service at Salt River.

Liveries
The locomotives were delivered in a bottle green and yellow whiskers livery with red cowcatchers. Beginning c. 1960, a Gulf Red and yellow whiskers livery gradually replaced the green and yellow.

With both liveries, the locomotives all had red cowcatchers except in the Cape Western region, where units based at the Bellville Depot could often be identified by their yellow cowcatchers.

Some selected electric and diesel-electric locomotives were painted blue for use with the Blue Train, but without altering the layout of the paint scheme. During the late 1970s numbers E562 to E569 were painted blue with yellow whiskers for use on the Blue Train between Cape Town and Beaufort West in the Cape Western region. In the early 1990s no. E564 was renumbered E263 to represent a Series 1 locomotive and repainted in SAR green and yellow whiskers for use on tourist excursion trains.

MetroRail's shunting locomotive no. E590 was later painted in MetroRail's grey and yellow suburban livery.

Preservation
One of the 5E Series 3's is currently preserved in the meantime. 
Class 5E E564 incorrectly numbered as Series 1 E263 in preservation this unit is preserved at Bellville Loco Depot.

Works numbers
The EE and VF works numbers of the Class 5E, Series 3 and their known disposal are shown in the table.

Illustration
The main picture shows no. E590 in MetroRail livery, while the rest of the pictures serve to illustrate some of the other liveries in which Series 3 locomotives served.

References

2800
Bo-Bo locomotives
Vulcan Foundry locomotives
English Electric locomotives
Cape gauge railway locomotives
Railway locomotives introduced in 1958
1958 in South Africa